René Djédjémel Mélédjé (born 5 June 1958) is a retired Côte d'Ivoire hurdler.

At the 1985 African Championships he won the 110 metres hurdles and finished third in the 400 metres hurdles. He won bronze medals in the 400 m hurdles at the 1985 Summer Universiade and in 110 m hurdles at the 1987 All-Africa Games.

He participated in 4 × 400 metres relay at the 1983 World Championships, the 1984 Summer Olympics, the 1987 World Championships and the 1988 Summer Olympics.

His personal best time is 48.94 seconds, achieved in August 1986 in Zürich. This is the current national record.

Achievements

References

External links

1958 births
Living people
Ivorian male hurdlers
Athletes (track and field) at the 1984 Summer Olympics
Athletes (track and field) at the 1988 Summer Olympics
Olympic athletes of Ivory Coast
African Games bronze medalists for Ivory Coast
African Games medalists in athletics (track and field)
Universiade medalists in athletics (track and field)
Athletes (track and field) at the 1987 All-Africa Games
Universiade medalists for Ivory Coast
Competitors at the 1986 Goodwill Games
Goodwill Games medalists in athletics